Leucochrysum albicans, commonly known as hoary sunray, is a species of plant in the family Asteraceae. It is endemic to Australia. It grows to 45 cm high and has grey-green woolly leaves that are between 2.5 and 10 cm long and 1 to 9 mm wide. The  flowerheads appear between spring and summer. These have yellow centres surrounded by either white or yellow bracts.

The species was first formally described by botanist Allan Cunningham in 1825 in Geographical Memoirs on New South Wales. He gave it the name Helichrysum albicans. Subsequently the species was placed in the genus Helipterum in 1929 and Leucochrysum in 1992.

The species is native to Queensland, New South Wales, Victoria and Tasmania.

Subpecies

Leucochrysum albicans subsp. albicans 
Leucochrysum albicans subsp. tricolor (DC.) N.G.Walsh

References

Gnaphalieae
Flora of New South Wales
Flora of Queensland
Flora of Tasmania
Flora of Victoria (Australia)
Taxa named by Paul G. Wilson